Vernon Ferdinand Dahmer Sr. (March 10, 1908 – January 10, 1966) was an American civil rights movement leader and president of the Forrest County chapter of the NAACP in Hattiesburg, Mississippi. He was murdered by the White Knights of the Ku Klux Klan for his work on recruiting Black Americans to vote.

Early life and family
Vernon Dahmer was born on March 10, 1908, in the Kelly Settlement, Forrest County, Mississippi to Ellen Louvenia (née Kelly) and George Washington Dahmer. George Dahmer, whose parents were German immigrants from Hesse-Darmstadt, was known as an honest, hardworking farmer of integrity. Vernon's mother Ellen was of mixed race: Her father, Warren Kelly, was of mixed ancestry, the son of mulatto Green H. Kelly, ultimately descended from John Kelly, a white settler; and her mother, Henrietta (McComb), was biracial, born out of wedlock to a white slave owner and one of his slaves and given to be raised by a black family, the McCombs. His cousin, Iola Williams, became the first African-American member of the San Jose, California, City Council in 1979.

Dahmer attended Bay Spring High School until the tenth grade; he failed to graduate. He was light-skinned enough to pass as a white man, but he chose to forgo the privileges of living as a white man and as a result, he faced the daily challenges of being a black man in Mississippi during that time.

Dahmer was married three times. His first wife was Warnie Laura Mott (1910–1975); their marriage of seven years ended in divorce in 1935. In 1938, Dahmer remarried; this time to a woman named Ora Lee Smith (1919–1950). Unfortunately, Aura died after a long illness in 1950. Ellie Jewel Davis (born June 27, 1925) was his third and final wife; she was a teacher from Rose Hill, Mississippi, and had recently moved to Forrest County. The couple met after working on the school board together and married in March 1952. The couple had two children together, Dennis and Bettie, to add to the six children Dahmer had with his first two wives (three children from each marriage), making a total of seven boys and one girl. The family and their home was located north of Forrest County and was part of the Kelly Settlement, close to the Jones County border; the settlement (named for Dahmer's maternal grandfather). Ellie Dahmer taught for many years in Richton, Mississippi and retired in 1987 from the Forrest County school system.

Dahmer was a member of Shady Grove Baptist Church where he served as a music director and Sunday School teacher. He was the owner of a grocery store, sawmill, planing mill, and also cotton farm. His main objective was to make a living for himself and to provide work for somebody else. He would hire local individuals from the community to work for him and did not discriminate between black or white.

Civil rights activism
During the civil rights movement, Dahmer served two terms as president of the Forrest County Chapter of the National Association for the Advancement of Colored People (NAACP) and led voter registration drives in the 1960s. His wife Ellie said "He was a good progressive Christian man. He wasn't a mean, bitter Civil Rights worker, because he saw good in white as well as he did in black." As president of the Forrest County Chapter of the NAACP, he had personally asked the Student Nonviolent Coordinating Committee (SNCC) to send workers to help aid the voter registrations efforts being made by African Americans in Hattiesburg, Mississippi. SNCC had sent two workers, Curtis Hayes and Hollis Watkins, to Hattiesburg. The act of calling SNCC to help aid the efforts made by the NAACP would eventually cost him his NAACP presidency.

In 1949, Dahmer was in the process of making out his new registration card when Luther Cox denied his attempts to re-register. Luther Cox was the authority figure in charge of registered voters in Forrest County and was a white segregationist. Cox would only authorize a registration of a black person if they could answer the question "How many bubbles are in a bar of soap?" In 1950, fifteen leaders of Forrest County's black community, including Dahmer, filed a lawsuit against Cox for his administration of the voting laws; preliminary injunction. Twelve years later, in March 1962, the preliminary injunction was in motion of being viewed by the court of law. Dahmer had testified in court against Luther Cox and his testimony helped demonstrate the pattern of discrimination in the county.

In the 1950s, Dahmer and Medgar Evers founded a youth NAACP chapter in Hattiesburg. The student chapter did not last longer than a year. Dahmer continued to be supportive of the SNCC throughout the Civil Rights Movement. Dahmer's farm quickly became a home away from home for SNCC volunteers. The farm was also used for registration projects and helped employ the committee volunteers. Dahmer was also working closely with the Coalition for Free and Open Elections (COFO) and the Delta Ministry.

Dahmer kept a voter registration book in his grocery store in late 1965 to make it easier for blacks to register. Dahmer also made a public service announcement over the radio stating that he would help the local African American population pay a poll tax for the right to vote if they could not afford to do so themselves. His mantra was, "If you don't vote, you don't count", and those words, which he repeated on his deathbed, were used as his epitaph.

Murder and suspects

The Dahmers had been sleeping in shifts because they had been receiving numerous death threats throughout the year. The Dahmers also kept a shotgun by the nightstand and they were willing to use it in case they heard gunshots and needed to return fire and they always kept the curtains tightly drawn at night in order to make it harder for night riders to see into their home. On January 10, 1966, the Dahmer home was attacked by the White Knights of the Ku Klux Klan. The family woke to the sound of a shotgun being discharged and the sound of gas jugs being thrown through the windows. As Ellie went to grab the children, the house erupted into fire. Dahmer returned fire from inside the house in order to try and distract the Klansmen while he helped hand Bettie down to Ellie. He was able to leave his burning home, but he was seriously burned from the waist up; Bettie's arms were also severely burned. The Dahmers' home, grocery store, and car were all destroyed in the fire. Dahmer was taken to the hospital, but he died of smoke inhalation and his lungs were also severely burned. Before he died, Dahmer told a local newspaper reporter: "I've been active in trying to get people to register to vote. People who don't vote are deadbeats on the state. I figure a man needs to do his own thinking. What happened to us last night can happen to anyone, white or black. At one time I didn't think so, but I have changed my mind."

The Chamber of Commerce, under Bob Beech and William Carey College President Dr. Ralph Noonkester, led a community effort to rebuild the Dahmer's home. Local and state businesses such as the Masonite Corporation, Alexander Materials, and Frierson Building Materials donated materials, local unions donated their services, and students from the University of Southern Mississippi volunteered by doing unskilled labor. Bob Beech's second priority was to provide college funds to Dahmer's school-aged children. Four of Dahmer's sons were serving in the United States military but they left their posts in order to help bury their father and reconstruct their family's home.

The authorities indicted fourteen men. Most of them had Ku Klux Klan connections, so they could be tried for the attack on the Dahmer's home. Thirteen of the men were brought to trial; eight of them were brought to trial on arson and murder charges. Four of the men were convicted and Billy Roy Pitts (Sam Bowers' bodyguard), who had dropped his gun at the crime scene, entered a guilty plea and his gun was turned in as state's evidence. Billy only served three years of his federal prison sentence. However, three out of the four men who were convicted were pardoned within four years. In addition, eleven of the defendants were tried on federal charges of conspiracy to intimidate Dahmer because of his civil rights activities. Former Ku Klux Klan Imperial Wizard Sam Bowers, who was believed to have ordered the murder, was tried four times and each time he invoked the Fifth Amendment. Each trial ended in a mistrial.

Twenty-five years after the murder of Vernon Dahmer and the assault on his family, the case was reopened by the state of Mississippi. The case lasted seven years, and it ended with the conviction and sentencing to life in prison of Imperial Wizard Bowers in 1998. Bowers died in the Mississippi State Penitentiary on November 5, 2006, at the age of 82.

Honors and recognition
After Dahmer's death, a street and a park in Hattiesburg were both named in his honor. On July 26, 1986, a memorial to Dahmer was also dedicated at the park.

In 1992, Dahmer's widow, Ellie, was elected election commissioner of District 2, Forrest County. For more than a decade, she served in this position, supported by black and white residents, in the same district where her husband was killed for his voting rights advocacy.

On January 8, 2016, the Mississippi State Legislature honored the civil rights leader by designating January 10 Vernon Dahmer Day. A commemoration ceremony, which was attended by Dahmer's widow and family, was held in Hattiesburg on the 50th anniversary of his death. Today, his family still attends the Shady Grove Baptist Church and its members are also very active in the community.

In January 2020, a bronze statue of Dahmer was erected in front of the Forrest County Courthouse.

References

External links
 SNCC Digital Gateway: Vernon Dahmer, Documentary website created by the SNCC Legacy Project and Duke University, telling the story of the Student Nonviolent Coordinating Committee & grassroots organizing from the inside-out
Sandra Peters, "32 Years to Justice", United Methodist Church Global Board Ministries
Mississippi faces past in Klan trial by Philip Delves Broughton in Hattiesburg. The Daily Telegraph (August 19, 1998). Retrieved October 23, 2007.
Photographs of the events following Vernon Dahmer's murder Moncrief Photograph Collection, Mississippi Department of Archives and History.
Dahmer (Vernon F.) Collection - University of Southern Mississippi
Oral history with Mrs. Ellie J. Dahmer - University of Southern Mississippi
WCU to celebrate Civil Rights activist Vernon Dahmer with literature collection
The Case of the 1966 KKK Firebombing - Federal Bureau of Investigation
 Dahmer's wife and daughter discuss the night he died, broadcast on NPR, January 13, 2017

1908 births
1966 deaths
1966 murders in the United States
African-American activists
Activists for African-American civil rights
African-American businesspeople
20th-century American businesspeople
American democracy activists
Assassinated American civil rights activists
Businesspeople from Mississippi
Deaths by improvised explosive device in the United States
History of voting rights in the United States
Ku Klux Klan crimes in Mississippi
Murdered African-American people
People from Forrest County, Mississippi
People from Hattiesburg, Mississippi
People murdered in Mississippi
Racially motivated violence against African Americans
Male murder victims